The 2003 USC Trojans football team represented the University of Southern California in the 2003 NCAA Division I-A football season. They were named the Associated Press and Football Writers Association of America (FWAA) national champions but were denied a spot in the BCS National Championship Game by the BCS selections for the national championship game.

The regular season ended with three one-loss teams in BCS contention: Oklahoma, LSU and USC.  USC ended the regular season ranked #1 and LSU #2 in both the AP Poll and the Coaches' Poll.  USC lost one triple-overtime game at California, which finished 8–6; LSU had  a 12-point home loss against a Florida team that went 8–5; Oklahoma, which had been ranked #1 for most of the season, fell to #3 after suffering a 35–7 defeat in the 2003 Big 12 Championship Game to Kansas State, which finished 11–4.  Controversy erupted when the BCS computers selected Oklahoma–LSU as the BCS title game.  During the bowl games, USC had a convincing 28–14 win over #4 Michigan in the Rose Bowl while LSU beat Oklahoma 21–14 in the Sugar Bowl (designated the BCS title game).  USC remained #1 in the final AP Poll with 48 of the 65 votes, and LSU was ranked, by contractual obligation, #1 in the final Coaches' Poll, though three coaches did not follow instructions and voted USC #1 in that poll as well.

Recruiting
With the late arrival of highly touted quarterback John David Booty, who left high school a year early to attend USC, the Trojans' 2003 recruiting class was considered by some to be the best in the country.

Its legacy included many NFL Draft picks over several years, including five first-round picks.

2006 NFL Draft:
 Reggie Bush (Round 1, Pick 2)
 Matt Leinart (Round 1, Pick 10)
 LenDale White (Round 2, Pick 45),
2007 NFL Draft:
 Steve Smith (Round 2, Pick 51)
 Eric Wright (Finished career at UNLV, Round 2, Pick 53)
 Ryan Kalil (Round 2, Pick 59)
2008 NFL Draft:
 Sedrick Ellis (Round 1, Pick 7)
 Sam Baker (Round 1, Pick 21)
 Lawrence Jackson (Round 1, Pick 28)
 Terrell Thomas (Round 2, Pick 63)
 John David Booty (Round 5, Pick 137)
 Thomas Williams (Round 5, Pick 155)
 Chauncey Washington (Round 7, Pick 213)

Schedule

Game summaries

Auburn

    
    
    
    
    

USC opened the season visiting Auburn University: the Tigers were also ranked in the top 10 and had been named a pre-season favorite to be the national champion by at least one major news organization.  In his first start, quarterback Matt Leinart led the Trojans on a dominating 23–0 performance.

Roster

References

USC
USC Trojans football seasons
College football national champions
Pac-12 Conference football champion seasons
Rose Bowl champion seasons
USC Trojans football